Lupicinus may refer to:

 Lupicinus (magister equitum), consul 367
 Lupicinus (comes per Thracias), commander in the Gothic Wars 367/377
 Lupicinus of Lyon, archbishop of Lyon, 491–494
 Lupicinus of Condat, abbot and saint, 5th century
 Flavius Licerius Firminus Lupicinus, Gallo-Roman scholar of the 6th century